Air Chief Marshal Sir Edgar Rainey Ludlow-Hewitt,  (9 June 1886 – 15 August 1973) was a senior Royal Air Force commander.

Early life
He was the second son and the second of five children of the Rev. Thomas Arthur Ludlow-Hewitt (17 May 1850 - 16 June 1936) of Clancoole, Co. Cork and later vicar of Minety, Wiltshire and Edith Annie Hudson (9 March 1854 - 15 November 1944).

First World War
Educated at Eastman's School, Radley College and Sandhurst, Ludlow-Hewitt was commissioned into the Royal Irish Rifles in 1905, but transferred to the Royal Flying Corps (RFC) before the First World War, where he qualified on 11 September 1914 for the Royal Aero Club's Aviator's Certificate no. 886. During the war he served first as a pilot in No. 1 Squadron Royal Flying Corps and then later as the Officer Commanding No. 15 Squadron and No. 3 Squadron on the Western Front. In 1916 Ludlow-Hewitt took up command of the 3rd (Corps) Wing as a temporary lieutenant colonel. Late in the following year, he was promoted to brigadier general and made the Inspector of Training at the headquarters of the RFC Training Division. Like other members of the RFC, he transferred to the Royal Air Force (RAF) on its creation on 1 April 1918. It was also on that date that he became General Officer Commanding (GOC) the Training Division. Less than two months later he was appointed GOC the 10th Brigade.

Later career
He was appointed Air Secretary in 1922 and Commandant of the RAF Staff College in 1926. He went on to be Air Officer Commanding Iraq Command in 1930, Deputy Chief of the Air Staff and Director of Operations and Intelligence in 1933 and Air Officer Commanding the RAF India in 1935. In 1937 Ludlow-Hewitt was promoted to Air Chief Marshal and appointed Air Officer Commanding-in-Chief of Bomber Command. In the Second World War, Ludlow-Hewitt was replaced by Portal in April 1940 because of Ludlow-Hewitt's insistence on the formation of Operational Training Units, at the expense of the availability of front line airmen. He spent the remainder of the war as Inspector-General of the RAF and did not retire until November 1945, making him the RAF officer with the longest service as an Air Chief Marshal during the 20th century.

References

|-

|-

|-

|-

|-

|-

|-

1886 births
1973 deaths
Graduates of the Royal Military College, Sandhurst
Aviation pioneers
Royal Air Force air marshals
Royal Air Force generals of World War I
Royal Ulster Rifles officers
Royal Flying Corps officers
Knights Grand Cross of the Order of the Bath
Knights Grand Cross of the Order of the British Empire
Companions of the Order of St Michael and St George
Companions of the Distinguished Service Order
Recipients of the Military Cross
Chevaliers of the Légion d'honneur
Deputy Lieutenants of Wiltshire